1904 in sports describes the year's events in world sport.

American football
College championship
 College football national championship – Penn Quakers

Professional championships
 Ohio League championship – Massillon Tigers
 Western Pennsylvania Championship – Latrobe Athletic Association

Events
 15 November — Canton Athletic Club (later renamed the Canton Bulldogs) is first established.

Association football
International
 World governing body FIFA is founded. The football associations of England, Scotland, Wales and Ireland do not join at this time.
Austria
 Formation of the Austrian Football Association (Österreichischer Fußball-Bund or ÖFB)
Brazil
 Botafogo de Futebol e Regatas was founded in Rio de Janeiro.
England
 The Football League – The Wednesday 47 points, Manchester City 44, Everton 43, Newcastle United 42, Aston Villa 41, Sunderland 39
 FA Cup final – Manchester City 1–0 Bolton Wanderers at Crystal Palace, London.
Germany
 National Championship – competition is annulled by the DFB following a protest by Karlsruher FV that matches have not been played on neutral grounds as stipulated by the rules.
Portugal
 Benfica founded in Lisbon as the Grupo Sport Lisboa.  In 1908, it merges with SC de Benfica to form Sport Lisboa e Benfica (SL Benfica).
Scotland
 Scottish Football League – Third Lanark
 Scottish Cup final – Celtic 3–2 Rangers at Hampden Park
Sweden
 Formation of the Swedish Football Association (Svenska Fotbollförbundet or SvFF)

Athletics
 Michael Spring wins the eighth running of the Boston Marathon.

Australian rules football
VFL Premiership
 Fitzroy wins the 8th VFL Premiership – Fitzroy 9.7 (61) d Carlton 5.7 (37) at Melbourne Cricket Ground (MCG)

Baseball
World Series
 NL champion New York Giants refuses to participate in the 1904 World Series.  Boston Americans repeat as American League champions.
Events
 5 May — Cy Young of Boston Americans pitches a perfect game, the second of his three no-hitters.  He goes on to complete 24 hitless innings, still the record, and 45 scoreless innings, a record broken by Jack Coombs in 1910
 Duluth White Sox wins the Northern League championship

Boxing
Events
 29 April — Barbados Joe Walcott meets Dixie Kid to defend the World Welterweight Championship and, though well on top, is disqualified by the referee after 20 rounds for an alleged foul.  Kid claims the title but it is subsequently discovered that the referee has bet on Kid to win and so Kid's claim is widely disregarded.
 30 September — Walcott meets World Lightweight Champion Joe Gans in a non-title fight which is scored a draw after 20 rounds.
 17 October — Joe Bowker (England) challenges Frankie Neil in London for the World Bantamweight Championship and wins over 20 rounds, the first non-American to hold this title.
 31 October — Joe Gans meets Jimmy Britt in San Francisco to defend the World Lightweight Championship.  Britt knocks Gans down four times but, after the last one in the fifth round, he hits Gans again before he has stood up and is disqualified for the foul.  Afterwards, Gans vacates the title which is awarded to Britt.  Two years later, Gans will claim that the fight has been fixed by his and Britt's managers.
 31 December — during a New Year celebration, Walcott accidentally shoots himself in the hand to effectively ending his days as a top prizefighter.  While he will return to the ring in 1906 (losing his welterweight title in the process), he never regains his old form and loses most of his subsequent fights.
Lineal world champions
 World Heavyweight Championship – James J. Jeffries
 World Light Heavyweight Championship – Bob Fitzsimmons
 World Middleweight Championship – Tommy Ryan
 World Welterweight Championship – Barbados Joe Walcott
 World Lightweight Championship – Joe Gans → Jimmy Britt
 World Featherweight Championship – Abe Attell
 World Bantamweight Championship – Frankie Neil → Joe Bowker

Cricket
England
 County Championship – Lancashire
 Minor Counties Championship – Northamptonshire
 Most runs – Tom Hayward 3170 @ 54.65 (HS 203)
 Most wickets – J T Hearne 145 @ 18.84 (BB 8–49)
 Wisden Cricketers of the Year – Bernard Bosanquet, Ernest Halliwell, James Hallows, Percy Perrin, Reggie Spooner
Australia
 Sheffield Shield – New South Wales
 Most runs – Victor Trumper 990 @ 55.00 (HS 185*)
 Most wickets – Wilfred Rhodes 65 @ 16.23 (BB 8–68)
India
 Bombay Presidency – Parsees
South Africa
 Currie Cup – Western Province
West Indies
 Inter-Colonial Tournament – Trinidad and Tobago

Cycling
Tour de France
 Henri Cornet (France) wins the Tour de France

Figure skating
World Figure Skating Championships
 World Men's Champion – Ulrich Salchow (Sweden)

Golf
Major tournaments
 British Open – Jack White
 U.S. Open – Willie Anderson
Other tournaments
 British Amateur – Walter Travis
 US Amateur – Chandler Egan

Horse racing
England
 Grand National – Moifaa
 1,000 Guineas Stakes – Pretty Polly
 2,000 Guineas Stakes – St. Amant
 The Derby – St. Amant
 The Oaks – Pretty Polly
 St. Leger Stakes – Pretty Polly
Australia
 Melbourne Cup – Acrasia
Canada
 King's Plate – Sapper
Ireland
 Irish Grand National – Ascetic's Silver
 Irish Derby Stakes – Royal Arch
USA
 Kentucky Derby – Elwood
 Preakness Stakes – Bryn Mawr
 Belmont Stakes – Delhi

Ice hockey
Stanley Cup
 January — Ottawa Hockey Club defeats Winnipeg Rowing Club to defend the Stanley Cup in a Cup challenge.
 February — Stanley Cup champion Ottawa Hockey Club withdraws from the Canadian Amateur Hockey League (CAHL) over a demand by the league to replay a game.
 February — Ottawa defeats Toronto Marlboros in a Cup challenge.
 2 March — Ottawa plays Montreal Wanderers to a 5–5 tie in a Cup challenge, but Montreal refuses terms of continuation of series and defaults.
 March — Quebec Bulldogs win the CAHL championship and demand the Stanley Cup, but the trustees rule the Cup stays with Ottawa. Quebec refuses to play Ottawa in a challenge.
 March — Ottawa defeats the Brandon Wheat Kings 2 games to 0 in a Cup challenge.
 18 December — Dawson City Nuggets begin a 4,000 mile journey by dog sled to play the Ottawa Hockey Club in a Stanley Cup challenge scheduled for 13 January 1905.

Motor racing
Gordon Bennett Cup
 Fifth running of the Gordon Bennett Cup takes place in the Taunus mountains in Germany.  The winner is Léon Théry (France) driving a Richard-Brasier.
Circuit des Ardennes
 The third Circuit des Ardennes is run on 25 July over 591.255 km (118.251 km x 5 laps) in the vicinity of Bastogne.  The winner is George Heath (USA) driving a Panhard-Levassor 70 hp in a time of 5:30:49.
Vanderbilt Cup
 William Kissam Vanderbilt II launches the Vanderbilt Cup at a course set out in Nassau County, New York on Long Island.  It creates controversy in New York with numerous attempts made, including legal action, to try to prevent it taking place.  The inaugural race is run over a  course of winding dirt roads through Nassau County.  Several European drivers with experience of the Gordon Bennett Cup take part and the event is a huge commercial success.  The winner is George Heath (USA) driving a Panhard-Levassor 70 hp.

Olympic Games
1904 Summer Olympics
 The third Summer Olympics took place in St. Louis, Missouri, United States.
 Lacrosse was played at the Olympics for the first time.
 The first Africans participated in the Olympics: two Tswana athletes competed at the St. Louis Games in the marathon.
 The United States won the most medals (239) and the most gold medals (78).

Rowing
The Boat Race
 26 March — Cambridge wins the 61st Oxford and Cambridge Boat Race

Rugby league
England
 Championship – Bradford FC
 Challenge Cup final – Halifax 8–3 Warrington at The Willows, Salford
 Lancashire League Championship – not contested
 Yorkshire League Championship – not contested

Rugby union
Home Nations Championship
 22nd Home Nations Championship series is won by Scotland

Speed skating
Speed Skating World Championships
 Men's All-round Champion – Sigurd Mathisen (Norway)

Tennis
England
 Wimbledon Men's Singles Championship – Laurence Doherty (GB) defeats Frank Riseley (GB) 6–1 7–5 8–6
 Wimbledon Women's Singles Championship – Dorothea Douglass Lambert Chambers (GB) defeats Charlotte Cooper Sterry (GB) 6–0 6–3
France
 French Men's Singles Championship – Max Decugis (France) defeats André Vacherot (France) 6–1 9–7 6–8 6–1
 French Women's Singles Championship – Kate Gillou (France) defeats Françoise Masson (France): details unknown
USA
 American Men's Singles Championship – Holcombe Ward (USA) defeats William Clothier (USA) 10–8 6–4 9–7
 American Women's Singles Championship – May Sutton (USA) defeats Elisabeth Moore (USA) 6–1 6–2
Davis Cup
 1904 International Lawn Tennis Challenge –  5–0  at Warple Road (grass) London, United Kingdom

References

 
Sports by year